Franco Alejandro Perinciolo (born 30 April 1997) is an Argentine professional footballer who plays as a midfielder for Atlanta on loan from Aldosivi.

Career
Perinciolo is a product of the Banfield youth system. In 2018, Perinciolo departed to join Cañuelas of Primera C Metropolitana. Seven goals, which included a hat-trick over Justo José de Urquiza, in twenty matches followed after he joined mid-season, with the club making the promotion play-offs; though would lose in round one to Central Córdoba. On 24 July 2018, Perinciolo was signed by Primera B Metropolitana side Comunicaciones. He scored on his debut for them, netting in a 3–1 defeat to Estudiantes on 8 September. July 2019 saw Perinciolo move across the third tier to Sacachispas. Fourteen appearances followed.

On 23 July 2020, Perinciolo was signed by Primera División side Aldosivi. With only eight appearances in one and a half years, Perinciolo was loaned out to Atlanta in January 2022 for the rest of the year.

Career statistics
.

References

External links

1997 births
Living people
Place of birth missing (living people)
Argentine footballers
Association football midfielders
Primera C Metropolitana players
Primera B Metropolitana players
Cañuelas footballers
Club Comunicaciones footballers
Sacachispas Fútbol Club players
Aldosivi footballers
Club Atlético Atlanta footballers